Calliotectum tibiaeforme is a species of sea snail, a marine gastropod mollusk in the family Volutidae, the volutes.

Subspecies
 Calliotectum tibiaeforme barneli Bail, 2006
 Calliotectum tibiaeforme johnsoni (Bartsch, 1942)
 Calliotectum tibiaeforme williamsorum (Rehder, 1972)

Description

Distribution
This marine species occurs off the Philippines.

References

 Kuroda, T. 1931. Two new species of Volutacea. Venus 3: 45–49 page(s): 45, figs 2,3 [details]   
 Bail, P., 2006. A new subspecies of Calliotectum tibiaeforme Kuroda, 1931 (Gastropoda: Volutidae Rafinesque, 1815) from the eastern Celebes Sea. Visaya 1(6): 114–122

Volutidae
Gastropods described in 1931